Classid Trax is an EP by Luke Vibert under the alias "The Ace Of Clubs". The album was released on a 12" vinyl as a promo. The titled Classid Trax is a play on the words "classic acid tracks". In March 2007, Paperline Records made these tracks available as mp3 downloads . Bleep.com is selling the album in mp3 and flac formats.

Track listing
Side A:
"128.5" - 5:29
"124.2" - 3:57
Side B:
"125.8" - 4:09
"133.6" - 5:26

References
Discogs entry

2002 EPs
Luke Vibert EPs